Athis ahala is a moth in the family Castniidae first described by Herbert Druce in 1896. It is found in Amazonas, Brazil.

References

Moths described in 1896
Castniidae